The Golden Apples is a short story collection with seven stories written by Eudora Welty, first published in 1949. The stories form an interrelated cycle, which explores the economic and social plight of the fictional Morgana Mississippi: “Shower of Gold”; “June Recital”; “Sir Rabbit”; “Moon Lake”; “The Whole World Knows”; “Music from Spain” and “The Wanderers.”

The stories use shared themes and other literary devices to ensure that the stories operate as a unified whole. One reviewer noted that "Allusion and metaphor hang as thick as Spanish moss in Welty's prose."

Reexamining the collection in 2011, The Independent critic David Evans described the collection as evocative, "But it is her vivid evocations of nature that linger." Another 2011 review in The Guardian wrote that the collection is "brilliantly capturing the precise timbre of a fleeting moment and revealing its startling load."

References

Further reading 
 

Short story collections by Eudora Welty
1949 short story collections
Southern United States literature
Harcourt (publisher) books